Curious George is a fictional monkey who is the title character of a series of popular children's picture books written by Margret and H. A. Rey and illustrated by Alan Shalleck. Various media, including films and TV shows, have been based upon the original book series. 

George is described as "a good little monkey, and always very curious". Despite being referred to as a monkey throughout the series, he is depicted without a tail. In the first book, George is caught by "The Man in the Yellow Hat" and taken from Africa to America where the two live together. George and the Man in the Yellow Hat become friends and are shown going on adventures together. 

George's first appearance was as a monkey named "Fifi" in the book Cecily G. and the Nine Monkeys, which was first published in France during 1939 in the late years. The popularity of the character led the Reys to feature "George" in his own series.

Creation 
The original series was written by the husband-and-wife team of Hans Augusto (H. A.) Rey and Margret Rey. The Jewish couple fled Paris in June 1940, on bicycles they'd made themselves, carrying the Curious George manuscript with them.  At first, only H. A. Rey was credited for the work in order to distinguish the Reys' books from the large number of children's books written by female authors. The first seven books were illustrated by H.A. Rey. Later, Alan J. Shalleck was credited for the illustrations and Hans Rey and Margret Rey for the writing. The Reys produced many other children's books, but the Curious George series was the most popular. Each book has been in continuous print since it was first published.

Literature 

Margret and H. A. Rey released seven "Curious George" books during H. A. Rey's lifetime. Recently, more Curious George books have been released by Houghton Mifflin Harcourt including board books with scenes from the original books, books adapted from the 1980s telefilm series, and new adventures.

Original Adventures
Curious George appeared in 1941. This book begins with George living in Africa and tells the story of his capture by the Man with the Yellow Hat, who takes him on a ship to "the big city" where he will live in a zoo. The second book, Curious George Takes a Job (1947), begins with George living in the zoo, from which he escapes and has several adventures before the Man with the Yellow Hat finds him and takes George to live at his house. The remaining five stories describe George's adventures while living at the house of the Man with the Yellow Hat. (Although the Man with the Yellow Hat is unnamed in both the original books and telefilm books, he receives his name in the Curious George TV series and is known as "Theodore Shackleford".) 

Sometimes dubbed the "Original Adventures," these original seven titles are completely by the series creators, Margret & H. A. Rey.

 Curious George (1941)
 Curious George Takes a Job (1947)
 Curious George Rides a Bike (1952)
 Curious George Gets a Medal (1957)
 Curious George Flies a Kite (1958)
 Curious George Learns the Alphabet (1963)
 Curious George Goes to the Hospital (1966)

Before appearing in his own series, Curious George appeared as a character in another children's book written and illustrated by H. A. Rey, Cecily G. and the Nine Monkeys (1939).

Books adapted from telefilms

A second series of books, based on the telefilm series, was edited by Margret & H.A. Rey and Alan J. Shalleck.  These appeared between 1984 and 1993.  They are mostly out of print, though several have been re-released with new cover art.

"New Adventures" 

A third series of books, the Curious George "New Adventures," began to appear in 1998, and continues to the present. These books are "illustrated in the style of H. A. Rey" by a variety of credited and uncredited artists including Mary O'Keefe Young, Martha Weston, Anna Grossnickle Hines, Michael Alan Jensen, and Vipah Interactive.

"The Man in the Yellow Hat" 

Aside from George himself, the only recurring character in the original adventures is the Man with the Yellow Hat who is George's best friend. The Man often facilitates George's adventures by taking him somewhere, and even more often resolves the tension by intervening just in time to get George out of a tight spot. He is always seen wearing a bright yellow suit and a wide brimmed yellow hat. The Man is never mentioned by name in the original adventures or in any subsequent content over more than six decades.

He is always referred to as "The Man" or fully "The Man with the Yellow Hat". But aside from those two names, he is unnamed in the original series and telefilm books. When people speak to George about the Man, they often refer to him as "Your friend". In H. A. Rey's book titled "See the Circus" published in 1946, "The Man with the Yellow Hat" was referred to as "Ted". Later, in Curious George (2006), the Man, who is voiced by Will Ferrell, is also referred to as "Ted" throughout the film, and his last name is revealed as being "Shackleford" in a deleted scene. In the TV series he is voiced by Jeff Bennett.

Other media
Curious George has been adapted into a television show, magazine, and video game.

Television
A set of animated Curious George television films were produced from 1979 to 1982; they were first shown in the United States in 1984 on Nickelodeon. This series was produced and co-written by Alan Shalleck.

The shorts were aired on The Disney Channel as a segment on the program Lunch Box starting in 1989.

In 1993, Margret Rey successfully sued Lafferty, Harwood, and Partners, the Canadian company that funded the cartoons, for licensing VHS tapes to third-party companies without the Reys' permission. The Reys eventually won the dispute, forcing Lafferty, Harwood, and Partners to pay for all wrongdoing.

A new Curious George series debuted on September 4, 2006, on PBS Kids as part of the PBS Kids Preschool Block. Although Curious George ended its original run on April 1, 2015, the series is still airing on PBS Kids in reruns. It was produced by the Boston affiliate WGBH, Imagine Entertainment, and Universal Animation Studios. A revival of the series was released on the streaming service Peacock on July 15, 2020.
Season 10 premiered on PBS on October 5, 2020.

Film

A 2017 film, Monkey Business: The Adventures of Curious George's Creators, documents the lives of Hans and Margret Rey including their flight from France during the 1940 invasion by Germany, their life in the United States, and their creation of the Curious George''' children's books.

Animated
A minimal-animation 16 mm film called Curious George Rides a Bike was produced by Weston Woods Studios in 1958 and later released on DVD.

In 1982, animator John Clark Matthews produced a 16mm stop-motion animated short called Curious George Goes to the Hospital based on the book of the same name. In 1984, they created another short, again based on the book of the same name. Produced by Churchill Films, the films were created with puppet-figures.https://www.jcm51.com/filmographyMatthews later used a similar technique for his films of Frog and Toad.

A computer/traditionally animated film, Curious George, featuring Will Ferrell as the voice of the originally unnamed Man with the Yellow Hat, was released on February 10, 2006. In this film (in which The Man is referred to as "Ted"), Curious George secretly follows The Man onto the ship to the city on his own accord. Frank Welker provided the vocal effects of Curious George. Ron Howard serves as the film's producer.

On March 2, 2010, a direct to video sequel to the film was released, titled Curious George 2: Follow That Monkey!, which featured Jeff Bennett replacing Ferrell as the voice of the Man. Bennett also provides the Man's voice in the television series. The second direct to video sequel, Curious George 3: Back to the Jungle, was released on June 23, 2015. Curious George: Royal Monkey was released on September 10, 2019. Curious George: Go West, Go Wild was released on Peacock on September 20, 2020. A sixth film, Curious George : Cape Ahoy finished development and was released on Peacock on September 30, 2021. A Christmas film, Curious George: A Very Monkey Christmas, was released in 2009 on PBS. "Curious George Swings Into Spring" and "Curious George: A Halloween Boo Fest" were released in 2013. On Monday, August 6, it began to re-run on Cartoonito.

Live-action/CGI animated
A live action/computer animated film was in development at Illumination Entertainment in the beginning of the 2010s. In August 2016, it was reported that Andrew Adamson was in negotiations to direct, co-write, and executive produce the live action film for Universal Pictures, along with Ron Howard, Brian Grazer, David Kirschner, Jon Shapiro and Erica Huggins producing it.

Video game
There is also a Curious George video game that was released on February 2, 2006, published by Namco and developed by Monkey Bar Games, a division of Vicious Cycle Software for Microsoft Windows, Xbox, GameCube, PlayStation 2, and Game Boy Advance. A version for the Nintendo DS was also planned, but was cancelled.

Other
A children's bookstore in Harvard Square, Cambridge, Massachusetts, was known as Curious George and Friends (formerly Curious George Goes To Wordsworth), and carried a considerable amount of licensed Curious George merchandise. It was the last remaining property of Wordsworth Books, a former local general interest bookstore that closed in the beginning of the 2000s. This store was closed in June 2011. A new store opened in 2012 at the same address, called The World's Only Curious George Store, Harvard Square, which closed permanently in 2021.

VEE Corporation, the company behind Sesame Street Live, is mounting Curious George Live. It is a brand new national tour featuring song and dance and Curious George himself. It is based on the PBS animated series.

Curious George is used as the theme for children's play areas and some of the children's entertainment on the Stena Line ferries. On some peak time sailings this includes a Curious George costumed character. Curious George merchandise is also provided with children's meals and is available to purchase in the on-board shop.

A Curious George themed water play area, called Curious George Goes to Town, Universal Studios Florida opened in 1998 and was removed in 2023. The attraction was also featured at Universal Studios Hollywood until its removal in 2013.

In February 2006, the Curious George brand joined with Welch's jelly for a collectible of six jars. In the latter part of that decade (when the new film and the new television show were released), licensing deals for the character generally involved less upscale, more kid-focused products. Earlier, Vivendi Universal (now NBCUniversal) had, for a short time, embraced the use of the character in a series of 2001 adverts for the company (but the character never officially became a corporate mascot).

In the film Forrest Gump of 1994, one edition of Curious George (one with a yellow cover but no other title than Curious George) is used as Forrest's favorite book, which his mother reads to him. In the opening scene a feather comes floating down to Forrest's feet and he stores it in this book. At the end of the film it falls out of the book and rises floating through the air again.

Jarrod, the titular character and protagonist from the NBC series The Pretender, read Curious George books in Season One and developed a fascination with them. He likened himself to George and Sydney Green, the psychiatrist whom he saw as a surrogate father, to the Man with the Yellow Hat.

The books have inspired others, for example Bangkok Bob'', written for and published by Big Brother Mouse, a Lao publishing project.

See also

Curious George Brigade

References

External links 

 
 "Curious George Saves the Day: The Art of Margret and H.A. Rey" Exhibition in The Jewish Museum New York
 Wall Street Journal on Curious George
 Curriculum material for educators Curious George Saves the Day
 1980 Television Series

 
Series of children's books
Fictional immigrants to the United States
Fictional monkeys
Literary characters introduced in 1939
Book series introduced in 1939